An air turbine is a turbine driven by airflow. Various forms include:

 Wind turbine, a renewable energy source
 Gas turbine, a type of internal combustion engine
 Ram air turbine (RAT), an emergency power system for aircraft
 Small air turbines, used as high-speed pneumatic motors in tools such as dentist's drills